Emre Sahin is a Turkish film and television director in Los Angeles, California and Istanbul, Turkey. Sahin is an experienced director, cinematographer and editor whose award-winning short film Canta won Best Cinematography at the Beverly Hills Film Festival, Audience Choice Award at the West Chester Film Festival, Best Foreign Short at the Fort Lauderdale International Film Festival and was named the Best Film of 2005 by Turkuaz magazine. Palm Springs Festival of Shorts and Rhode Island International Film Festival chose Canta as part of their Best of the Festival, a touring showcase of the festivals top films from each category. In addition, Canta is the official selection of over 30 additional film festivals around the world, from India to Ireland to Italy.

Before his foray into the scripted world, Emre directed and edited documentary and reality television shows for networks such as ABC, ABC Family, MTV, VH1, The History Channel, the Travel Channel, the Food Network, TLC and the Discovery Channel. Most recent directorial projects include TLC's provocative 10-episode series Beyond the Bull, following three of the world's top professional bull riders on their quest for the world title during the turbulent 2005 PBR season and the documentary, Life as a Marine, commissioned by JWT (named after James Walter Thompson), a large advertising agency. He is currently the executive producer, director and creator of the 13-episode documentary series, Cities of the Underworld, for The History Channel.

He is also a frequent guest on Turkish television.

Sahin is currently in pre-production on a feature film titled 7 Days in Baghdad.

Sahin is a Robert College graduate and a licensed football player.

External links

Thirty Four Productions (34P) website
Interview with Emre Sahin
Interview with Emre Sahin
Interview with Emre Sahin
Canta film website
40 film website

References

American people of Turkish descent
American television directors
Living people
Turkish film directors
Turkish expatriates in the United States
Year of birth missing (living people)